Congal Cennfota mac Dúnchada (died 674) was a Dal Fiatach king of Ulaid. He was the son of Dúnchad mac Fiachnai (died circa 644), a previous king. He ruled from 670 to 674. His nickname Cennfota means "Long-headed".

The Dal Fiatach dominated the kingship of Ulster from 637 to 674. Family strife was a common theme among the dynasty at this time. In 647 he killed or slew his uncle Máel Cobo mac Fiachnai the king of Ulaid. However Mael Cobhas son Blathmac mac Máele Cobo is mentioned as king of Ulaid before him in the annals so he probably did not acquire the overlordship of Ulaid till after Blathmac's death in 670. Congal suffered the same fate as his uncle when he was slain or killed by his cousin's son Bécc Bairrche mac Blathmaic (died 718) in 674.

Congal had a daughter named Conchenn ingen Congaill who was married first to Fínsnechta Fledach (died 695) of the Síl nÁedo Sláine, high king of Ireland and Congal may have had some support from the Ui Neill. She married secondly Bécc Bairrche.

Notes

See also
Kings of Ulster

References

 Byrne, Francis John (2001), Irish Kings and High-Kings, Dublin: Four Courts Press, 
 Charles-Edwards, T. M. (2000), Early Christian Ireland, Cambridge: Cambridge University Press,  
 Gearoid Mac Niocaill (1972), Ireland before the Vikings, Dublin: Gill and Macmillan

External links
CELT: Corpus of Electronic Texts at University College Cork

Kings of Ulster
674 deaths
7th-century Irish monarchs
People from County Antrim
Year of birth unknown